Guilherme Clezar was the defending champion, but lost to James Duckworth in the quarterfinals.
Rajeev Ram won the tournament by defeating André Ghem 4–6, 6–4, 6–3 in the final.

Seeds

Draw

Finals

Top half

Bottom half

References
 Main Draw
 Qualifying Draw

Rio Quente Resorts Tennis Classicandnbsp;- Singles
2013 Singles
Rio